Jurubaça was a term for interpreter in the Portuguese colonies of Southeast Asian and the Far East, particularly in Macau.  The term is prevalent in mid-sixteenth through eighteenth-century documents. According to the Grande Dicionário da Língua Portuguesa, a Jurubaça was an “Antigo intérprete da Malásia e do Extremo Oriente,” an ancient interpreter in Malaysia and the Far East.  The word derives from Malay jurubassa (juru bahasa) which translates as a person who is an interpreter.   The earliest document utilizing the word iurubaças dates from the sixteenth century.

References

Primary sources
 Certidaõ autentica de Antonio Lobo, e Simaõ Coelho Línguas da Cidade, e de Miguel Pinto. 1626 Set. 20. Biblioteca da Ajuda, Jesuítas na Ásia, Códice 49-V-6 fols, 255v-258v.
 Anno 1627 Regimento da Língua da Cidade e dos Jurubaças menores e Escrivaens. Biblioteca da Ajuda, Jesuítas na Ásia. Códice 49-V-6 fols, 457v-463.
 Published Primary Sources
 “Breve Relação da jornada q. fez a corte de Pekim O Senhor Manuel de Saldanha Embaxador Extraordinario del Rey de Portugal ao Emperador da China, e Tartaria: Comecando do Primeiro dia em que se embarcou em Cantão.” 14 Mayo 1667 Arquivos de Macau. Série 2. Vol. 1. Nº 1. Jan. 1941, 27-36.
 “Termo, e assento feito em Junta de Homens bons, sobre o Mandarim da Caza-branca haver prendido o Gerubaço em sua Caza á vista do Senado, que a ser chamado tinha ido á dita sua Caza.” 1688 Arquivos de Macau. Série 2a. Vol. 1. Nº 5. Set.-Out.1941, 271-273.
 “Termo do assento tomado em Junta de Homens bons, sobre a chamada de quarto Moradores para Cantão, sobre a prizão de Jerobaça João Gomes.” 1690 Arquivos de Macau. Série 1. Vol. 3a. Nº 3. Fev.1964, 27-28.
 “Termo do assento tomado em Junta de Homens bons, sobre haverem de se dar ao Mandrim de Hian-xan 2400 taeis, q’se lhe ficarão de dar acabando os negocios dos Homens chamados a Cantão, pela historia de João Gomes, e o China Miki.” 1690 Arquivos de Macau. Série 1. Vol. 3a. Nº 3. Fev.1964, 27-28.
 “Leal Senado de Macau. 25 April 1775. Approvando o soldo que antigamente tinha o Juresbaça (sic.); e dos 20 t.s de aluguel das cazas.” Arquivos de Macau. Série 3, Vol. 10. Nº 4. Out. 1968.
 Cartas dos Cativos de Cantão: Cristóvão Vieira e Vasco Calvo (1524?). edited by Rui Manuel Loureiro. Macau: Instituto Cultural de Macau, 1992.

Secondary sources
 Boxer, Charles Ralph. The Great Ship from Amacon: Annals of Macao and the Old Japan Trade, 1555-1640. Lisboa: Centro de Estudos Históricos Utramarinos, 1959.
 ―——Estudos para História de Macau. Séculos XVI a XVIII.  Lisboa: Fundação      Oriente, 1991.
 ———Fidalgos in the Far East 1550-1770. The Hague: Martinus Nijhoff, 1948.
 ———Macau na Época da Restauração. Macau: Imprensa Nacional, 1942.
 Cooper, Michael. Rodrigues the Interpreter: An Early Jesuit in Japan and China. New York: Weatherhill, 1974.
 Dutra, Francis A. and João Camilo dos Santos, eds. The Portuguese and the Pacific. Santa Barbara: Center for Portuguese Studies, University of California, Santa Barbara, 1995.
 Nuñez, Cesar Guillen. Macau. Hong Kong: Oxford University Press, 1984.
 Shipp, Steve. Macau, China: a Political History of the Portuguese Colony’s Transition to Chinese Rule. Jefferson, North Carolina: McFarland & Company, Inc., 1997.
 Souza, George Bryan The Survival of Empire: Portuguese Trade and Society in China and the South China Sea, 1630-1754. New York: Cambridge University Press, 1986.
 Russell-Wood, A.J.R. A World on the Move: the Portuguese in Africa, Asia and America, 1415-1808. New York: St. Martin's Press, 1993.
 Alves Jorge, “The First Decade of Portuguese-Chinese Diplomacy After the Founding of Macao.” Review of Culture, 1994, 5-10.
 Bouchon, Geneviève, “L’ interprète portugais en Inde au début du XVI siècle, in Simposio Interdisciplinar de Estudos Portugueses.” 1, Actas. Lisboa, 1987, vol. 2, 14-24.
 Braga J.M., “Interpreters and Translators in Old Macao.” International Conference on Asian History at the University of Hong Kong. Hong Kong, 1964. August 30-September 5. Paper No. 49, pages 1–11.
 Braga, José Maria, “Notes on the Lingua Franca of the East.” Renascimento April 1943, 329-142.
 Couto, Dejanirah, “The Role of Interpreters, or Linguas, in the Portuguese Empire During the 16th Century.” JPH, Vol. 1, number 2, Winter 2003, 2-10.
 Ferro, João Pedro, “Os Contactos Linguísticos e A Expansão da Língua Portuguesa.” História dos Portugueses no Extremo Oriente. Lisbon: Fundação Oriente, 1998. 1 Volume. Tomo I. Em Torno de Macau, 351-429.
 Flores, Jorge Manuel, “Comunicação e informação, saber e poder: os jurubaças e o uso do portugués em Macau una primeira metade do século XVII.” Encontro Portugués-Língua de Cultura, Macau, 27-29 Maio 1993, 109-111.
 ———“O Tempo da Euforia.” in A.H. de Oliveira Marques, ed. História dos Portugueses no Extremo Oriente Lisboa: Fundação Oriente, 2000. Vol. I, Tomo II, 179-213.
 ———”De Surgidouro a Cidade.” in A. H. de Oliveira Marques, ed. História dos Portugueses no Extremo Oriente Lisboa: Fundação Oriente, 2000.  Vol. I, Tomo II, 237-293.
 Jorge, Cećilia, “Intérpretes-Tradutores a Ponte da Coexistência.” Macau. Novembro 1992, 46-58.
 Scammell, G.V. “Indigenous Assistance in the Establishment of Portuguese Power in Asia in the Sixteenth Century.” Modern Asian Studies London: Cambridge University Press, 1980, 8.
 Valadez Mario Gómez “Between Linguistic walls and the Third Space: The Jurubaças Identity and Their role in Sino-Portuguese Negotiations After the 1622 Dutch Attack.” Edição bilingue. Existe versão em Chinês. International Edition. Sociedade Macaense. Revista de cultura. - Nº 25 (Janeiro 2008), p. 21-35

Portuguese colonisation in Asia
Language interpretation
Portuguese words and phrases